F.C. Be'er Sheva Haim Levy, Moadon Kaduregel Be'er Sheva Haim Levy, lit. Football Club Be'er Sheva Haim Levy (or in short , Mem Kaf Be'er Sheva Haim Levy, lit. F.C. Be'er Sheva Haim Levy) is an Israeli football club based in Be'er Sheva. The club is currently in Liga Gimel South division and play their home matches at the Reisser Synthetic Ground, which they share with youth teams of Hapoel Be'er Sheva.

The club is named after Haim Levy, a fan of Hapoel Be'er Sheva, who died after battling cancer at age of 34.

History
The club was founded in 2013 by group of Hapoel Be'er Sheva fans, which played football on Saturdays for several years, and decided to form their own team and to register it in the Israel Football Association. The club consists only of Hapoel Be'er Sheva fans.

The club finished their debut season in the seventh place of Liga Gimel South division.

External links
Football Club Be'er Sheva Haim Levy The Israel Football Association

References

Be'er Sheva Haim Levy
Sport in Beersheba
Association football clubs established in 2013
2013 establishments in Israel
Organizations based in Beersheba